Ylä-Malmi (Finnish), Övre Malm (Swedish) is a northern neighborhood of Helsinki, Finland. Many of Malmi's most important services are located on Ylä-Malmi side, such as the church, schools, hospital and police station.

See also
 Ala-Malmi

References

Neighbourhoods of Helsinki